LZO may refer to:

 Lempel–Ziv–Oberhumer, a data compression algorithm
 Luzhou Yunlong Airport (IATA code), a military and civilian airport, Luzhou, China
 Luzhou Lantian Airport (former IATA code), a military airport, Luzhou, China